Forbes was a Swedish dansband (literal translation: "dance band") of the 1970s.

The band represented Sweden in the Eurovision Song Contest 1977 with the entry "Beatles". The song is about the British band of the same name. Forbes ended in 18th and last place and got only two points. It was one of the worst placements ever for a Swedish entry in the Eurovision Song Contest.

The band consisted of Peter Forbes, Roger Capello, Claes Bure, Peter Björk, Anders Hector and Chino Mariano.

References

External links 
 Information about Forbes in 1977
 Forbes (in Swedish)

Eurovision Song Contest entrants for Sweden
Eurovision Song Contest entrants of 1977
Dansbands